Kido or KIDO may refer to:

 Kido (surname)
 KIDO, an American radio station
 Kidō, a form of magic used by characters in the manga and anime Bleach
 Conficker or Kido, computer worm
 Gao Hanyu or Kido, Chinese actor and singer